= Juche historiography =

Juche historiography is a historical perspective formed by the Democratic People's Republic of Korea under the influence of Juche ideology. The main advocates included Huang Changye and others.

== Proposal ==
Since the 1950s when the concept of "Juche Historiography" was proposed, North Korean historians began to analyze and interpret historical documents from new perspectives, reaching conclusions on many issues that differed completely from traditional views. To consolidate these achievements, he began compiling the Juche historical work "Complete History of Korea" starting in December 1975.

== Content ==
Juche historiography holds that the Korean people originated on the banks of the Taedong River, dating back about one million years. The first slave state identified by Juche historians was the ancient Joseon period, roughly from the 30th century BCE to 108 CE, founded by Dangun. The name 'Chosun' is derived from the phrase 'morning sun is clear.' The ancient Joseon period is divided by Juche historiography into three stages: Former Joseon, Later Joseon, and Wiman Joseon from China, which does not recognize the existence of Gija Joseon. Regarding Goguryeo, the feudal state established by Go Jumong in 37 BCE, Juche historiography avoids mentioning the founding of Goguryeo. Goguryeo was invaded by the Sui and Tang dynasties, forming two alliances: the Silla-Tang alliance and the Baekje-Goguryeo alliance. After the Silla-Tang alliance destroyed Baekje, they destroyed Goguryeo. After Goguryeo was destroyed, the Tang established the Andong Protectorate. Later, Silla clashed with the Tang Dynasty, which defeated the latter by gathering the people of Baekje and Goguryeo. By 735 AD, unified Silla was recognized by the Tang Dynasty, with its territory covering the area south of the Taedong River. After unifying Silla, the Korean people experienced the Goryeo Dynasty, the Eastern Expeditionary Branch of the Central Secretariat, and the Joseon Dynasty. Due to official corruption, temple construction, and the growth of the commodity economy, the Joseon Dynasty experienced usury and exploitation, intensifying social conflicts under the feudal system and sparking popular uprisings. Juche historiography holds that popular uprisings in the Joseon Dynasty were historically inevitable, and that these uprisings shook Korea's feudal system. Thus, the Korean Peninsula entered a semi-colonial, semi-feudal society. After Kim Il-sung established the North Korean government, the Korean national faction emerged from a semi-colonial, semi-feudal society.

== Timeline ==
The North Korean Foreign Language Press divides North Korea's history into the following periods:

== The era of slavery ==
- Ancient Joseon (early 30th century BCE–108 BCE)
- Buyeo (mid-15th century BCE–219 BCE)
- Chen Kingdom (12th century BCE–1st century BCE)
- During the feudal era
- Goguryeo (277 BC–668 BC)
- Baekje (late 1st century BCE–660)
- Silla (mid-1st century—935)
- Bohai (698–926)
- Goryeo Dynasty (918–1392)
- Joseon Dynasty (1392–1910)

== Development ==
Since the early 1980s, major changes have occurred in the internal and external environment of the peninsula. In 1986, North Korea proposed "Korean National First Principle". After the dramatic changes in Eastern Soviet and Soviet Union in 1989, he further emphasized "highly promoting the spirit of putting the nation first." Based on this, a 33-volume edition of the Complete History of Korea, published in 1982, suggests that some areas have fallen behind the current situation. For example:

“When educating the public on patriotism amid complex internal and external circumstances, promoting 5,000 years of history and brilliant ancient culture is an important part of the curriculum. However, after the 'Complete History' denies Gija Joseon, only 2,000 years have passed since the Keeper of Manchu Joseon. Only by affirming Tangun can it be true to its historical significance. Moreover, traditional historiography acknowledges that Jizi's "Eight Prohibitions" educated the people, while Juche historiography denies that after Jizi came east, only by affirming the legendary teachings of Emperor Shi Shi during Huanxiong's descendation to "benefit the world" can the original source of political ideas be found locally.

The traditional Korean historical continuation table is based on Joseon (including Dangun Joseon, Gija Joseon, and Wiman Joseon). )—Three Kingdoms period—Unified Silla—Goryeo—Joseon. From the perspective of Juche historiography, the major flaws of this table are, first, the presence of a reverse subject; second, its emphasis on the south. Therefore, in December 1993, a new historiographical system was proposed: Ancient Korea (Dangun Joseon, Wiman Joseon) — Goguryeo — Bohai — Goryeo — Joseon. In the new historiographical system, Gija Joseon is denied its existence. During the Three Kingdoms period, only Goguryeo was considered legitimate (its territory was in the north, with its capital at Pyongyang). Silla and Baekje were reduced to separatist states, and unified Silla lost its historical status due to its betrayal of the main body (Tang dynasty). Although Balhae, as a multi-ethnic state not located on the peninsula, was considered a state founded by Goguryeo remnants and thus could continue its legitimacy.”

In this new system, Tanjun holds the leading position. Based on this new historical genealogy, in May 1993 and January 1994, the tombs of King Dongmyeong of Goguryeo (located in Lippo District, Pyongyang) and the tomb of King Taejo of Goryeo (located on Songak Mountain in Kaesong) were restored respectively. Seoul (present-day Seoul) was the capital of Korea's last feudal dynasty and was traditionally regarded as the political and cultural center of the nation. After the excavation, the Rodong Sinmun published an editorial stating: "The discovery of Dangun's tomb in Pyongyang indicates that Pyongyang is the birthplace of the Korean nation and the center of the formation and development of the Korean nation-state."

== Commentary ==
The Korean academic community has had mixed reactions to the newly rising "Dangun fever." Some believe this is not academic, but others argue: "In the era of openness, foreign cultural relics surged with ideas, and our national culture and legitimacy were challenged." In this context, the most important thing was to place the legitimacy and foundation of the nation on Dangun...... Whether Tanjun is present or not is secondary; the primary focus is to establish the main character. ”
